Pukou District, is one of 11 districts of Nanjing, the capital of Jiangsu province, China, lying northwest across the Yangtze River from downtown Nanjing.

The district was formerly the southern terminus of the Tianjin-Pukou Railway; railcars had to be ferried across the river until it was bridged in 1968.

Administrative subdivisions
Pukou has administrative jurisdiction to 9 subdistricts:

 Defunct - Shiqiao Town merged with Shiqiao Town & Wujiang Town merged into Qiaolin Subdistrict

Geography
Pukou District is located at the northwestern of Nanjing city, between the Yangtze River and Chu River.

It is separated from the main part of the city by the Yangtze River with hundred miles of mountains and forests.

It has an area of 902 square kilometers with a population of 480 thousand.

Climate 

Pukou District has a humid subtropical climate (Köppen climate classification Cfa).

Economy
In 2007, the GDP in the Yangtze River reached 元16.21 billion. There are four towns and seven block offices. Part of Pukou DIstrict is now covered under the new strategic economic development area: Jiangbei New Area.

Sites of interest
Ancient culture left behind a profound history including many cultural heritages. The region also boasts beautiful natural landscapes and many places of interest including National Ancient Mountain and Forest Park, Pearl Spring, Tang Spring, Amber Spring, Damo Stela, Huji Temple Site, Doulv Temple, Wen Temple and old ginkgo trees. A male ceramic mask found in the Panying Mountain Ancient Cultural site is honored as “the ancestor of Nanjing”, the oldest ever found artwork in this area. Pukou District has been the transportation intersection between the northern and southern regions, as well as the Gate of the North in Nanjing city. Facing the Yangtze River and with an overall control of Huai River Area, Pukou District is said to be “the Entrance of Nanjing” and “the Natural Fortress in the northwest” with Jinpu railway and the 312, 328, 104 state roads passing through. The first, second and third Bridge across the Yangtze River make it really convenient to travel.

References

External links

 Pukou government website

Districts of Nanjing
County-level divisions of Jiangsu